Calumet College of St. Joseph (or, Calumet College) is a private Roman Catholic college in Whiting, Indiana. It was founded in 1951 as an extension of Saint Joseph's College and is associated with the Missionaries of the Precious Blood. In fall 2017, it enrolled 624 undergraduates and 210 graduate students.

History
In 1951, St. Joseph's College of Rensselaer, Indiana, opened an extension in Lake County, Indiana. It was known as the Calumet Center. Most of its courses were taught in borrowed classrooms provided by the Bishop Noll Institute in Hammond and St. John the Baptist Church in Whiting. In 1960, the Board of Control authorized the expansion of this two-year extension into a full four-year, degree-granting college. In doing so, the institution became the first college in the Calumet Region to offer baccalaureate degrees. At that time, St. Joseph's College Calumet Campus moved into a new building, a former furniture store in East Chicago. Classes and administrative work were conducted in this building, which served the college for 15 years and later became the Administration Building. The East Chicago Campus continued to grow throughout the 1960s. Buildings were donated or acquired on Indianapolis Boulevard and Olcott Avenue to provide classroom and office space, a library, laboratories, a theater, a communications center and student recreational facilities. In summer 1971, the college was renamed St. Joseph Calumet College. It officially separated from St. Joseph's College on November 15, 1973, when articles of incorporation were filed with the state of Indiana. The college moved into its new facilities in January 1976 and is now using the largest of the 23 buildings on the site.

Academics

The college awards master's, bachelor's and associate degrees in a variety of fields. The college offers two accelerated degree completion programs through its School of Adult Learning. It also permits students to earn up to 45 semester hours of credit at the bachelor's degree level through alternative credit options.

Athletics
The Calumet (CCSJ) athletic teams are called the Crimson Wave. The college is a member of the National Association of Intercollegiate Athletics (NAIA), primarily competing in the Chicagoland Collegiate Athletic Conference (CCAC) for most of its sports since the 2001–02 academic year (when the school began its athletics program); while its bowling teams compete in the United States Bowling Congress (USBC).

CCSJ competes in 17 intercollegiate varsity sports: Men's sports include baseball, basketball, bowling, cross country, soccer, sprint football (2022), track & field and volleyball; while women's sports include basketball, bowling, cross country, soccer, softball, track & field and volleyball; and co-ed sports include cheerleading and competitive dance. Former sports included men's wrestling (which was added as a varsity sport back in the 2009–10 school year).

Bowling
CCSJ men's bowling finished second in the nation at USBC Collegiate Championships, in the 2009–10 school year. In 2016, the men's bowling teamed moved up and ranked first in the US at the USBC Collegiate Championships.

Sprint football
CCSJ will add sprint football, a weight-restricted form of American football governed separately from the NAIA or the National Collegiate Athletic Association (NCAA), in the 2022 fall season. It will be one of six charter members of the Midwest Sprint Football League.

Notable alumni
 Carmen Lomellin, an American diplomat of Mexican heritage from East Chicago, Indiana. Lomellin was the United States Ambassador to the Organization of American States from 2009 to 2016.
 Eddie D. Melton, Indiana State Senator, and manager of corporate citizenship and employee involvement at NIPSCO.
 Michael Puente, award-winning radio and newspaper reporter for WBEZ, Chicago's NPR-affiliate.
 Rick Soria, former president of Miami Dade College (Wolfson Campus) and former president of  Ivy Tech Community College, Michigan City.
 Dan C. Stevenson, former Indiana State Representative and steel worker, from Hammond and Highland, Indiana.
 Ronald Tabaczynski, former Indiana State Representative, former Lake County councilman, and current government affairs director for BOMA/Chicago from Hammond, Indiana.
 Darrow Tully, former publisher of the Arizona Republic and the Phoenix Gazette newspapers, published in Phoenix, Arizona.

References

External links
 
 Official athletics website

Northwest Indiana
Catholic universities and colleges in Indiana
Educational institutions established in 1951
Education in Lake County, Indiana
Buildings and structures in Lake County, Indiana
Roman Catholic Diocese of Gary
Chicagoland Collegiate Athletic Conference
1951 establishments in Indiana
Missionaries of the Precious Blood